San Marino competed at the 1984 Summer Olympics in Los Angeles, United States. 19 competitors, 18 men and 1 woman, took part in 26 events in 7 sports.

Coins commissioned
There were 2 coins commissioned in celebration the participation of The Republic of San Marino. One coin with a face value of 500 Sammarinese lira depicting the Three Towers of San Marino, three people and the Olympic symbols. The other worth a face value of 1000 Sammarinese lira showing the Three Towers of San Marino and two people standing on the Olympic symbols holding up a bird of prey.

Athletics

Men's 20 km Walk
 Stefano Casali
 Final — 1:35:48 (→ 35th place)
 Men's 800 meter 
 Manlio Molinari 
 Heat — 1:57.09 (→ 62nd place)

Cycling 

One cyclist represented San Marino in 1984.

Individual road race
 Maurizio Casadei — did not finish (→ no ranking)

Gymnastics

Maurizio Zonzini
Men's individual all around
ranked 65
Men's floor exercise
Ranked 66
Men's horse vault
Ranked 63
Men's parallel bars
Ranked 61
Men's horizontal bars
Ranked 68 
Men's rings
Ranked 68
Men's pommeled horse 
Ranked 34

Judo

Men's extra-lightweight
Alberto Francini
 Ranked 18

Men's middleweight
Franch Casadei
Ranked 18

Sailing

Men's windsurfer
Flavio Pelliccioni
ranked 29

Shooting

Men's Rapid-Fire Pistol, 25 metres
Eliseo Paolini
Ranked 29
Bruno Morri
Ranked 34

Men's Free Pistol, 50 metres
Germano Bollini
Tied for 51 with Gianfranco Giardi
Gianfranco Giardi
Tied for 51 with Germano Bollini

Men's Air Rifle, 10 metres
Pasquale Raschi
 Ranked 51

Men's Small-Bore Rifle, Three Positions, 50 metres
Pasquale Raschi
 Ranked 49
Alfredo Pelliccioni
 Ranked 51

Men's Small-Bore Rifle, Prone, 50 metres
Francesco Nanni	
Ranked 5 (best performance of entire Olympic team)
Pier Paolo Taddei
Ranked 62

Mixed Trap
Luciano Santolini
Ranked 31
Elio Gasperoni
48

Swimming

Men's 100m Freestyle 	
Michele Piva
 Heat — 59.26 (→ did not advance, 63rd place)

Men's 200m Freestyle 
Michele Piva
 Heat — 2:15.39 (→ did not advance, 54th place)

Men's 100m Breaststroke
Michele Piva
 Heat — 1:16.21 (→ did not advance, 48th place)

Men's 200m Individual Medley
Michele Piva
 Heat — 2:29.81 (→ did not advance, 41st place)

Women's 100m Freestyle
Daniela Galassi
 Heat — 1:06.19 (→ did not advance, 44th place)

Women's 200m Freestyle
Daniela Galassi
 Heat — 2:19.22 (→ did not advance, 34th place)

References

External links
Official Olympic Reports

Nations at the 1984 Summer Olympics
1984
Summer Olympics